Existir (English: "To exist") is the second studio album by Portuguese group Madredeus. It was released on 12 May 1990 through EMI-Valentim de Carvalho.

Style
The music in Existir uses the same instrumentation as its predecessor, with classical guitar, keyboards, accordion, cello and vocals by Teresa Salgueiro. It combines Portuguese folk with the additional use of keyboards and synthesizers.

Reception 
Existir reached number one in the Portuguese album charts and was 4 weeks at the top position.

"O Pastor" (English: "The Shepherd") was a hit in Portugal. It was covered by vocalist/guitarist Rafael Bittencourt on his solo record Bittencourt Project – Brainworms I.

Track listing

Personnel 
Credits are adapted from the album's inner notes.   

Musicians

 Teresa Salgueiro
 Pedro Ayres Magalhães
 Rodrigo Leão
 Gabriel Gomes
 Francisco Ribeiro

Production

 Pedro Ayres Magalhães – producer, mixing
 António Pinheiro da Silva – producer, mixing, recording
 André Navarro – cover design
 António Homem Cardoso – photography

Charts

References

1990 albums
Madredeus albums
EMI Records albums